Sanxia District is a district in the southwestern part of New Taipei, Taiwan. It is the second largest district in New Taipei City by area after Wulai District.

Name

History
After the first coffee plants on Taiwan were imported by the British to Tainan in 1884, the first significant small-scale cultivation took place in Sanxia District.

On December 25, 2010, Sanxia Township was upgraded to Sanxia District after the upgrade of Taipei County.

Geography
It has an area of 191.45 km2 and a population of 115,443 (February 2023).

Government institutions

 National Academy for Educational Research

Education
University
 National Taipei University Sanxia Main Campus (國立臺北大學三峽校區本部)

Senior High schools
 Mingde High school (市立明德高中)
 BeiDa High School (市立北大高中)
 Tsz-Shiou Senior High school (辭修高中)

Junior High schools
 Sanxia Junior High school (市立三峽國中)
 Anxi Junior High school (市立安溪國中)

Others
 National Academy for Educational Research Preparatory office-Planning Objectives

Tourist attractions
 Zushi Temple - The most important religious site in Sanxia. Originally built in 1769 by Fukienese immigrants to Taiwan, it has been rebuilt three times, of which the last effort (beginning 1947) is the masterpiece of renown Taiwanese artist Li Mei-shu. It is considered by many to be the most intricately sculpted temple in Taiwan.
 Sanxia Old Street - A business street built during the Japanese rule, it is a very well preserved example of baroque-style architecture of the time. The street features stores selling art, ceramics, and local specialty foods (most notably Bull Horn Croissants).
 New Taipei City Hakka Museum - the largest Hakka cultural center in Taiwan exhibiting the culture, history, and influence of the Hakka people in Taiwan and abroad.
 Li Mei-shu Memorial Gallery
 Sanxia History Museum - preserves artistic and cultural artifacts from Sanxia's past.
 Manyueyuan National Forest Recreation Area
 National Taipei University Arts Boulevard
 Sanxia Agricultural Specialty Products Museum
 Tourism Factory of Cha-Shan-Fang Soap
 Pigs of God (神豬()) Contest - The largest event held at Zushi Temple around Chinese New Year where farmers compete to raise the fattest pig. The fattest pig is then sacrificed at the temple but not to the main deity, Zushi-Ye (祖師爺()) as he was formerly a Buddhist monk. Controversial to animal rights activists, Zushi Temple is one of the few places in Taiwan that still practice this tradition.
 Sanxia Indigo Blue Dye Festival - A celebration of Sanxia's past as a major dyeing center in northern Taiwan.

Transportation
 Car — Sanxia is served by Freeway No. 3. (San-ying Interchange)
 Bus — Sanxia is accessible by bus from Taipei (buses 702, 703, 705, 706,939), Taoyuan District, and Yingge (Blue 19).
 Train — Although Sanxia does not have a train station, it is accessible by bus from Yingge Train Station across the river.
 MRT — Accessible via the Tucheng Line of the Taipei Metro to Yongning (永寧()). Bus 916 from exit 1 connects to Sanxia on Highway 3. In addition Bus 910 leaves from Fuzhong (府中()) station in Banqiao. Both routes are multi-section tickets, paying on entry or exit.

Notable natives
 Li Mei-shu, former painter, sculptor, and politician

See also
 New Taipei City

References

External links

  
 Sanxia tourist information (English)

Districts of New Taipei